The Wolf Hour is a 2019 psychological thriller film written and directed by Alistair Banks Griffin. It stars Naomi Watts, Emory Cohen, Jennifer Ehle, Kelvin Harrison Jr., Jeremy Bobb and Brennan Brown.

The film had its world premiere at the Sundance Film Festival on January 26, 2019. It was released on December 6, 2019, by Brainstorm Media.

Plot
In 1970s New York, former author June Leigh (Naomi Watts) lives alone in her late grandmother's dilapidated apartment after cutting herself off from the outside world. Riddled with anxiety and agoraphobia, she spends her days watching the derelict neighbourhood below from her fourth-story window, amidst the notorious "Summer of Sam" in the blistering heat.

June is visited by her estranged friend, Margot (Jennifer Ehle), who is shocked to see June in such a depressive state. Margot helps her clear out her apartment and attempts to get her to go outside, but June suffers a panic attack. Meanwhile, June's intercom buzzes throughout the day but nobody is there when she answers. Margot gives June a .38 caliber gun for protection.

It is revealed that June's father died from a heart attack, and her family blamed her controversial writing, disowning her. June calls her publishing house and asks for an advance; they refuse, claiming she must submit something new soon. She attempts to write a new novel, but suffers writer's block.

One afternoon, June allows Freddie (Kelvin Harrison Jr.), the boy who delivers her groceries, to use her sink to wash himself, and they become friends. He reveals his mother died in a house fire while trying to get him out, leaving him severely burned. June calls the police when the intercom harassment continues. A police officer (Jeremy Bobb) arrives and explains there is not much he can do, but suggests he can provide extra protection for her in return for sex.

Having avoided people for so long, a sexually frustrated June watches two neighbours have sex while masturbating. She later arranges for a male escort, Billy (Emory Cohen), to come to her apartment, and they have sex. Billy recounts being abused by his family as a child, claiming he got over his fears by facing them head on. He stays over, and they are awoken during the night by the intercom buzzing; Billy goes downstairs to investigate but nobody is there. He suggests the buzzings are a "calling", trying to get her to go outside. The following morning, June finds herself able to write.

June uses the last of her money to pay Freddie to deliver her completed new novel to the publishing house, but he does not return with her cheque. A blackout then hits, and rioting and looting begins in the area, leaving her alone and afraid in the dark. June watches a boy she thinks is Freddie being beaten by a police officer and forces herself to leave the apartment, only to discover it is not him. Instead of retreating, she musters the confidence to walk down the street, staring up towards the morning sun as it rises in the sky.

The film concludes with June, now recovered from her mental illness, being interviewed on television about her new book. The show host asks her if the book is based on her self-inflicted isolation period, and she smiles wryly.

Cast
 Naomi Watts as June Leigh
 Emory Cohen as Billy
 Jennifer Ehle as Margot
 Kelvin Harrison Jr. as Freddie
 Jeremy Bobb as Officer Blake
 Brennan Brown as Hans

Production
In October 2017, it was announced Naomi Watts would star in the film, with Alistair Banks Griffin directing from a screenplay he wrote. In November 2017, Jennifer Ehle, Emory Cohen, Kelvin Harrison Jr., Brennan Brown and Jeremy Bobb joined the cast of the film.

Release
The film had its world premiere at the Sundance Film Festival on January 26, 2019. Shortly after, Brainstorm Media acquired distribution rights to the film. It was released in the United States on December 6, 2019.

References

External links
 

2019 films
2019 psychological thriller films
2019 thriller drama films
American psychological thriller films
American thriller drama films
British psychological thriller films
British thriller drama films
Films set in 1977
Films set in New York City
Films shot in New York City
HanWay Films films
2019 drama films
2010s English-language films
2010s American films
2010s British films